Avotaynu: The International Review of Jewish Genealogy is a magazine that focuses on Jewish genealogy and family history published by Avotaynu Inc. (New Haven, Connecticut). It was established in 1985. An index to the first 24 volumes is available. The magazine gets its name from the Hebrew word, avotaynu, which literally means "our fathers," but has come to mean "our ancestors."

The Consolidated Jewish Surname Index (CJSI) is Avotaynu's metasearch engine which points to 42 different specialized data banks.

Avotaynu Inc. is also publishing books on the same topic (see homepage).

References

External links 
 
 Sallyann Sack Papers P-917, American Jewish Historical Society, Boston, MA and New York, NY.

History magazines published in the United States
Quarterly magazines published in the United States
Genealogy publications
Jewish genealogy
Magazines established in 1985
Magazines published in Connecticut
Mass media in New Haven, Connecticut
1985 establishments in Connecticut